Jean-Paul Cloutier,  (September 8, 1924 – December 19, 2010) was a Canadian politician from Quebec.

Background

He was born on September 8, 1924 in Saint-Paul-de-Montminy, Quebec and made a career in accounting and business.

Member of the legislature

Cloutier ran as a Union Nationale candidate in 1962 for the district of Montmagny and won.

Cabinet member

He was re-elected in 1966 and was appointed to Premier Daniel Johnson Sr.'s Cabinet.  Cloutier served as Minister of Family and Social Welfare.  Under his tenure, the department laid the groundwork for the public health insurance plan that would later be implemented by his Liberal successor Claude Castonguay.

Cloutier was re-elected in 1970, but was defeated in 1973.

City politics

He ran as the Parti du renouveau municipal mayoral candidate in Sainte-Foy, Quebec in 1985, but lost against Andrée Boucher.

In 2000, he was made a Member of the Order of Canada.

Death
He died in Quebec City on December 19, 2010.

References

1924 births
2010 deaths
Members of the Order of Canada
Union Nationale (Quebec) MNAs